Narmandakh Namuunaa (born 12 August 1999) is a Mongolian footballer who plays as a forward for Women's National Football League club Storm FC and the Mongolian women's national team. With two goals she is the top scorer of the national team.

Club career
Namuunaa began her career with Arvis FC of the Women's National Football League. In 2019 she scored two goals against New Yarmag Club in Arvis FC's opening match of the season, an eventual 11–0 victory. She went on to lead the team to an undefeated season and its third league title in the competition's five years of existence. She received the award of the league's best midfielder for her performances.

In 2022 Namuunaa joined the newly formed Storm FC. In its first season in the National League, the club had an undefeated season as it claimed the championship. Namuunaa was the league's top scorer with eighteen goals in as many matches. Following the season she was named the Female Player of the Year at the Mongolian Football Federation's annual Golden Ball Awards. She battled through injury on route to earning the honour.

International career
In September 2018 Namuunaa was named to the Mongolian women's senior national team squad for its first-ever match, a 2019 EAFF E-1 Football Championship contest against the Northern Mariana Islands. She went on to score two goals in the eventual victory, including the team's first-ever goal and game-winner. The following month she was a member of the Mongolian team that competed in qualification for the 2020 Summer Olympics.

In September 2021, Namuunaa took part in both of Mongolia's matches in 2022 AFC Women's Asian Cup qualification matches, including defeats to South Korea and Uzbekistan.

International goals
Scores and results list Mongolia's goal tally first.

International career statistics

Honours
As of 15 February 2023

Individual
Best Striker: 2017, 2022
Best Midfielder: 2018
MFF Golden Ball (Best Female Player): 2022

References

External links
Global Sports Archive profile
AFC profile
MFF profile
Core Scores profile

1999 births
Living people
Mongolian footballers
Association football forwards
Mongolia international footballers